Gennady Vasilyevich Kostyrchenko (Костырченко, Геннадий Васильевич) (born 1954) is a Russian historian in Soviet politics.

Books

 В плену у красного фараона. Политические преследования евреев в последнее сталинское десятилетие. Moscow: Mezhdunarodnye otnosheniia, 1994.
 Out of the Red Shadows: Anti-Semitism in Stalin’s Russia. Amherst, MA: Prometheus Books, 1995. —English edition of В плену у красного фараона.
 Тайная политика Сталина. Власть и антисемитизм. Moscow: Mezhdunarodnye otnosheniia, 2001. Second revised and expanded edition: 2003.
 Сталин против «космополитов». Власть и еврейская интеллигенция в СССР. Moscow: ROSSPEN, 2009.
 Тайная политика Хрущёва: власть, интеллигенция, еврейский вопрос. Moscow: Mezhdunarodnye otnosheniia, 2012.
 Тайная политика: от Брежнева до Горбачева Moscow: Mezhdunarodnye otnosheniia, 2019.

References

1954 births
Living people
20th-century Russian historians
21st-century Russian historians